RootkitRevealer is a proprietary freeware tool for rootkit detection on Microsoft Windows by Bryce Cogswell and Mark Russinovich. It runs on Windows XP and Windows Server 2003 (32-bit-versions only). Its output lists Windows Registry and file system API discrepancies that may indicate the presence of a rootkit. It is the same tool that triggered the Sony BMG copy protection rootkit scandal.

RootkitRevealer is no longer being developed.

See also
Sysinternals
Process Explorer
Process Monitor
ProcDump

References 

Microsoft software
Computer security software
Windows security software
Windows-only software
Rootkit detection software
2006 software